Sister Sridevi is a 2017 Indian Odia-language romantic comedy film produced by Tarang Cine Productions. Babushaan and Sivani star, with Mihir Das and Aparajita Mohanty are in supporting role. The movie is a remake of 2016 Tamil movie Remo.

Premise
A romantic story with an extra dose of comedy. This is a story of a boy who goes to extreme lengths of disguising his gender to win the love of his beloved.

Cast
 Babushaan as Sanju
 Sivani Sangita as Sunayana
 Mihir Das
 Aparajita Mohanty
 Salil Mitra
 Jayprakash Das
 Tribhuban Raj
 Pratyush toltia

Music
The music for the film was composed by Abhijit Majumdar

 Music Director - Abhijit Majumdar
 Lyricist - Nirmal Nayak
 Male Vocals - Tarique Aziz, Rituraj Mohanty
 Female Vocals - Sanju Mohanty, Pragyan

Soundtrack
The soundtrack has music composed by Abhijit Majumdar with lyrics by Nirmal Nayak. The music was released on 12 June 2017.

Box office
The film was released on 9 June 2017 during Raja festival across Odisha to positive reviews. The movie grossed 18 Lakh on its first day and collected 70 lakh in first week. In the second & third week it grossed respectively 1.03 crore & 30 Lakh.

References 

2017 comedy-drama films
Indian comedy-drama films
Odia remakes of Tamil films
2010s Odia-language films
Cross-dressing in Indian films
Films directed by Ashok Pati